The following is a list of notable deaths in November 1996.

Entries for each day are listed alphabetically by surname. A typical entry lists information in the following sequence:
 Name, age, country of citizenship at birth, subsequent country of citizenship (if applicable), reason for notability, cause of death (if known), and reference.

November 1996

1
Maati Bouabid, 68, Prime Minister of Morocco.
Sid Cann, 85, English football player and manager.
Lycette Darsonval, 84, French dancer.
Edgardo Enríquez, 84, Chilean physician, academic and politician.
Junius Richard Jayewardene, 90, President of Sri Lanka, colon cancer.
William Johnstone, 88, American actor.
Clyde Lynn, 60, American racing driver.
Eric Reissner, 83, German-American civil engineer and mathematician.

2
Eva Cassidy, 33, American singer and guitarist, melanoma.
John G. Crommelin, 94, American naval officer and white supremacist politician.
Joseph Lambert Eustace, 88, Governor-General of Saint Vincent and the Grenadines.
Pierre Grimal, 83, French classical philologist.
Kang Hyo-shil, 64, South Korean actress.
Yan Jici, 95, Chinese physicist and politician.
Shanti Swaroop Rana, 47, Indian military officer, killed in action.
Laurence L. Sloss, 83, American geologist.
Arnie Tuadles, 40, Filipino basketball player, shot.

3
Jean-Bedel Bokassa, 75, 2nd President of the Central African Republic and Emperor of Central Africa, heart attack.
William Clarke, 45, American blues harmonica player and singer.
Ray Mansfield, 55, American gridiron football player (Philadelphia Eagles, Pittsburgh Steelers), heart attack.
Marian Plezia, 79, Polish historian.
Barry Porter, 57, British politician, cancer.
Yevhen Shcherban, 50, Ukrainian businessman and politician, assassinated, homicide.
Isaac M. Taylor, 75, American medical academic, pneumonia.
Abdullah Çatlı, 40, Turkish nationalist and leader of the Grey Wolves, traffic accident.

4
T. Vincent Learson, 84, American chairman and chief executive officer of IBM.
Ray Linn, 76, American jazz trumpeter.
Konstantin Loktev, 63, Russian ice hockey player, liver cirrhosis.
Gottlieb Weber, 86, Swiss cyclist.

5
Bunny Breckinridge, 93, American actor and drag queen.
Allen Broussard, 67, American judge.
Eddie Harris, 62, American jazz musician, congestive heart failure.
Joaquín Monserrat, 75, Spanish comedian and host of children programs.
Wilhelm Sturm, 56, German football player.
John Dragon Young, 47, Hong Kong-American historian and politician.

6
Harry Brophy, 80, English football player.
Vadim Ivanov, 53, Russian football player Russian football player and manager.
Houn Jiyu-Kennett, 72, British Rōshi.
Dragan Kresoja, 50, Serbian film director.
Tommy Lawton, 77, English football player and manager, pneumonia.
Richard Nelson, 57, American theatrical lighting designer.
Mario Savio, 53, American activist and Berkeley Free Speech Movement member, heart problems.

7
Claude Ake, 57, Nigerian political scientist, plane crash.
Beauford T. Anderson, 74, United States Army soldier and recipient of the Medal of Honor.
Feliciano Centurión, 34, Paraguayan visual artist, AIDS-related complications.
Bill Chisholm, 87, American athletics competitor.
Carmell Jones, 60, American jazz trumpet player, heart failure.
Hans Klodt, 82, German football player.
Sverre Kolterud, 88, Norwegian Nordic combined skier.
Salvatore Lauricella, 74, Italian politician and mayor.
Bosh Pritchard, 77, American National Football League football player.
Jaja Wachuku, 78, Nigerian prince, politician, diplomat and Pan-Africanist.

8
Andrés Rivero Agüero, 91, Cuban politician.
Laurence Baxter, 42, English statistician.
Peter Fowler, 73, British physicist.
Johannes Frömming, 86, German harness racing driver and trainer.
Franklin Gritts, 81, Native American painter and commercial artist.
Mathews I, 89, Indian Supreme Primate of the Malankara Orthodox Syrian Church.
Tan Onuma, 78, Japanese writer.
Sydney Selwyn, 62, British physician and medical scientist, multiple system atrophy.

9
Gudmundur Arnlaugsson, 83, Icelandic chess player.
Joe Ghiz, 51, Canadian lawyer and politician, cancer.
Michel Mitrani, 66, French film director and screenwriter.
Roger Makins, 1st Baron Sherfield, 92, British diplomat.
Alvin Straight, 76, American lawn mower traveler.
Yoshimi Ueda, 90, Japanese basketball player and administrator.

10
Imam Alimsultanov, 39, Popular Chechen bard and folk singer, homicide.
Jack Evans, 68, Canadian ice hockey player and coach, prostate cancer.
Yaki Kadafi, 19, American rapper (Outlawz, Dramacydal), shot.
Richard Mayo, 94, American Army general and athlete.
Marjorie Proops, 85, British journalist.
Manik Varma, 70, Indian classical singer.
Gucheng Zhou, 98, Chinese politician.

11
Janice Adair, 91, British film actress.
Jo Baker, 48, American singer and songwriter, liver disease.
Eugene Davy, 92, Irish rugby union football player and coach.
Curt Göransson, 87, Swedish general and commander of the Army.
Lum Harris, 81, American baseball player, coach, manager, and scout, complications of diabetes.
Paul J. F. Lusaka, 61, Zambian politician and diplomat.
Gober Sosebee, 81, American racecar driver, agriculture accident.

12
Thomas Miller Bell, 73, Canadian politician, lawyer and barrister.
Don Kenyon, 72, English cricket player.
Le Nguyen Khang, 65, South Vietnamese commander.
Peter Leeds, 79, American actor, cancer.
Cordell Reagon, 53, American singer and activist, homicide.
Tom Reid, 70, Irish rugby player.
Vytautas Žalakevičius, 66, Lithuanian film director and writer.

13
Bill Doggett, 80, American jazz and R&B pianist and organist, heart attack.
June Gale, 85, American actress, pneumonia.
James Galloway, 68, American film editor.
Alma Kitchell, American concert singer.
Katja Medbøe, 50, Norwegian actress, suicide.
Swami Rama, Indian yoga guru.
Bobbie Vaile, 37, Australian astronomer, brain cancer.

14
Jim Baxes, 68, American Major League Baseball player (Los Angeles Dodgers, Cleveland Indians).
Joseph Bernardin, 68, American Cardinal of the Catholic Church, pancreatic cancer.
Nell Blaine, 74, American landscape painter and watercolorist.
Virginia Cherrill, 88, American actress, stroke.
Giuliano Giuliani, 38, Italian football player, complications of AIDS.
Nodar Gvakhariya, 64, Soviet water polo player.
Meridel Le Sueur, 96, American writer.
Derek Marlowe, 58, English playwright, novelist, and painter.
Elman Service, 81, American anthropologist.
Jacomina van den Berg, 86, Dutch gymnast and Olympian.

15
William Boddington, 85, American field hockey player and Olympian.
Ellis Wayne Felker, 48, American man convicted of murder, execution by electric chair.
Henri Friedlaender, 92, Israeli typographer and book designer.
William E. Hall, 83, United States Naval Reserve officer and recipient of the Medal of Honor.
Alger Hiss, 92, American State Department official and alleged spy.
John J. Lenzini, Jr., 49, American horse trainer in Thoroughbred flat racing.
Lila Shanley, 86, American stuntwoman, actress, and athlete, heart failure.
Ahmed Zaki, 65, Prime Minister of the Maldives.

16
Reginald Bevins, 88, British politician.
Dondinho, 79, Brazilian football player and manager.
Joe Gonzales, 81, American Major League Baseball player.
Jens Peter Hansen, 69, Danish football player.
Masud Karim, 60, Bangladeshi lyricist.
Liam Naughten, 52, Irish Fine Gael politician, traffic accident.
Jack Popplewell, 85, English writer and playwright.
Benjamin Arthur Quarles, 92, American historian, educator, and writer, heart attack.
Vasil Spasov, 76, Bulgarian football player and manager.

17
Michele Abruzzo, 91, Italian actor.
Gus Kyle, 73, Canadian ice hockey player.
Karl-Heinz Moehle, 86, German U-boat commander during World War II.
Huo Shilian, 87, Chinese politician.
Kurt von Ruffin, 95, German actor and opera singer.

18
Antonije Abramović, 77, Archbishop of the Montenegrin Orthodox Church.
Bob Bearpark, 53, Canadian soccer coach.
Zinovy Gerdt, 80, Soviet/Russian actor.
Douglas Guest, 80, British organist and conductor.
Charles Hare, 81, British tennis player.
Raymond Harvey, 76, United States Army lieutenant colonel and recipient of the Medal of Honor.
James Stuart Holden, 82, American attorney and judge.
Evelyn Hooker, 89, American psychologist.
Greer Lankton, 38, American artist and doll maker, drug overdose.
Charlie Neal, 65, American baseball player, heart failure.
John Vassall, 72, British civil servant and spy, heart attack.
Étienne Wolff, 92, French biologist.
Zhu Zuxiang, 80, Chinese educator.

19
Gabriel Alonso, 73, Spanish football player.
Harry Anderson, 90, American illustrator.
Grace Bates, 82, American mathematician.
Milton Carpenter, 91, American politician.
Phil Hankinson, 45, American basketball player, suicide.
Nicole Hassler, 55, French figure skater and Olympian.
Véra Korène, 95, Russian-French actress and singer.

20
Bert Achong, 67, Trinidadian and Tobagonian scientist, brain tumor.
Jens Boyesen, 76, Norwegian diplomat and politician.
Danny Dare, 91, American film director and choreographer.
Liam Dowling, 65, Irish hurler.
Gustl Gstettenbaur, 82, German actor.
Bill Sayles, 79, American baseball player.
Franciszek Strynkiewicz, 103, Polish sculptor.
Bill Vernon, 59, American radio personality.

21
Syed Mohammed Mukhtar Ashraf, Indian Sufi saint, spiritual leader and islamic scholar.
Sandro Continenza, 76, Italian screenwriter.
Chuck Howard, 63, American television executive, and a pioneer in television sports broadcasting, brain cancer.
Elmo Langley, 68, American NASCAR driver and owner, heart attack.
Liu Pang-yu, 53, Taiwanese politician, murdered.
Bernard Rose, 80, British organist, soldier, and academic.
Abdus Salam, 70, Pakistani physicist, Nobel Prize laureate, progressive supranuclear palsy.

22
Stephanie Bachelor, 84, American film actress.
Peter Barbour, 71, Australian intelligence officer and diplomat.
Garrett Birkhoff, 85, American mathematician.
Ray Blanton, 66, American businessman and politician.
Walter Boos, 68, German film editor and director.
María Casares, 74, Spanish-French actress, colon cancer.
Willy Derboven, 57, Belgian road bicycle racer.
Terence Donovan, 60, English photographer and film director, suicide.
Robert Jaulin, 68, French ethnologist.
Mark Lenard, 72, American actor (Star Trek), multiple myeloma.
Adeniran Ogunsanya, 78, Nigerian lawyer and politician.
Edmund Teske, 85, American photographer.

23
Mohamed Amin, 53, Kenyan photojournalist, plane crash.
Jean-Paul Elkann, 74, French banker.
Ken Lane, 83, American musician.
Charlotte Pierce, 92, American actress.
Art Porter, Jr., 35, American jazz saxophonist, drowned.
Eve Rimmer, 59, New Zealand paralympic athlete.
Idries Shah, 72, Indian Sufi writer and teacher.
Tim Wilson, 42, American gridiron football player.

24
Loren Bain, 74, American baseball player.
Edison Denisov, 67, Russian Soviet composer.
Paulos Mar Gregorios, 74, Indian Metropolitan.
William Johnstone, 88, American actor.
Tupua Leupena, 74, Governor-General of Tuvalu.
Sorley MacLean, 85, Scottish Gaelic poet.
Louis-Frédéric Nussbaum, 73, French Indologist.
Michael O'Hehir, 76, Irish sports commentator and journalist.
Titus Ozon, 69, Romanian football player and manager.

25
Ricardo López Aranda, 61, Spanish playwright.
Don Dobie, 69, Australian politician.
Hans Jura, 75, Austrian cinematographer.
Margaret Rioch, 89, American psychotherapist.
Charles Stokes, 94, American politician, jurist, and lawyer, cancer.

26
Michael Bentine, 74, British comedian, prostate cancer.
Norman Le Brocq, 74, British communist, trade union activist, and resistance leader during World War II.
Isabella Henriette van Eeghen, 83, Dutch historian. Added/updated entries
Guido Gratton, 64, Italian football player.
Joan Hammond, 84, Australian operatic soprano.
Philippe Hirschhorn, 50, Latvian violinist, brain cancer.
Elrey Borge Jeppesen, 89, American aviation pioneer.
Bill McElwain, 93, American gridiron football player and coach.
Narinder Singh Randhawa, 69, Indian agricultural scientist and writer.
Paul Rand, 82, American graphic designer, cancer.

27
Balot, 70, Filipino comedian and actor, complications from diabetes.
Nicholas L. Bissell, Jr., 49, American attorney and fraudster, suicide.
Aloysio Borges, 78, Brazilian modern pentathlete.
Vladimir Firm, 73, Croatian football player.
Jack Penn, South African plastic surgeon, sculptor and author.

28
Charles Bressler, 70, American tenor.
Harlan Hanson, 71, American educator and director of the Advanced Placement Program.
Robert J. McCloskey, 74, American diplomat.
John Jaffurs, 73, American football player and coach.
Don McNeill, 78, American tennis champion.
Anna Pollak, 84, English opera singer.

29
Dick Bilda, 77, American gridiron football player.
Jordan Cronenweth, 61, American cinematographer (Blade Runner, Peggy Sue Got Married, Altered States), Parkinson’s disease.
Dan Flavin, 63, American minimalist artist, diabetes, diabetes.
Denis Jenkinson, 75, British motorsports journalist.
Dragoslav Srejović, 65, Serbian archaeologist, cultural anthropologist and historian.
Bob Steuber, 75, American gridiron football player.

30
Ted Petoskey, 85, American athlete, coach in three sports and athletic director.
Kacem Slimani, 48, Moroccan football player.
Max Thompson, 74, United States Army soldier and recipient of the Medal of Honor.
Tiny Tim, 64, American musician ("Tiptoe Through the Tulips", "Livin' in the Sunlight, Lovin' in the Moonlight"), heart attack.
Peng Wan-ru, 47, Taiwanese politician, murder, homicide.
John Williamson, 45, American basketball player, kidney failure.

References 

1996-11
 11